Escuinapa de Hidalgo is a city in Escuinapa Municipality of the same name, located at the extreme southern end of the Mexican state of Sinaloa. At the census of 2005 the city had a population of 28,789 inhabitants (the sixth-largest community in the state), while the municipality reported 49,655 inhabitants. According to the Mexican Government, Escuinapa will have near 500,000 inhabitants in 2025 for the mega touristic center that are building near the town, and will be finished in 2025; with this information we can know Escuinapa de Hidalgo will be the second or third city more important in Sinaloa, also will be between the second and fourth place according population by municipality, maybe over Ahome and behind Mazatlán. The municipality has an area of 1633.22 km² (630.58 sq mi) and includes the towns of Isla del Bosque and Teacapan, in addition to many smaller localities.

History

On January 5th, 2023, during the capture of Ovidio Guzmán López (drug lord El Chapo's son), an infantry colonel and four escorts were ambushed and killed by cartel members in Escuinapa de Hidalgo.

References

Link to tables of population data from Census of 2005 INEGI: Instituto Nacional de Estadística, Geografía e Informática
Sinaloa Enciclopedia de los Municipios de México

External links

Ayuntamiento de Escuinapa Official website

Populated places in Sinaloa

nl:Escuinapa (gemeente)
pl:Escuinapa
pt:Escuinapa
ru:Эскуинапа